Lost in Time is a two-part story of The Sarah Jane Adventures which was broadcast on CBBC on 8 and 9 November 2010. It is the fifth story of the fourth series.

Plot
Sarah Jane, Clyde, and Rani are lured to a shop after where an alien has supposedly been sighted. The Shopkeeper forces the three of them to look for pieces of Chronosteen, a metal that can reshape destiny. They are transported in time to three different eras.

Rani arrives in the Tower of London in 1553 on the day the armies of future Queen Mary I arrive in London and are to usurp Lady Jane Grey. Lady Matilda plots to kill Jane with a Chronosteen dagger to make Jane a martyr for the Protestants to rise up against the Catholic Queen Mary. Rani stops Matilda, and promises Jane that she will not be forgotten by history.

Clyde arrives in a coastal village in Norfolk in 1941, where three Nazi Schutzstaffel soldiers arrive on the beach. Clyde and George, an evacuee boy, hide in the church, and see the Nazis have a Chronosteen hammer which they intend to use to block radar systems and start the invasion of Britain. Clyde distracts the Nazis with his mobile phone, claiming it is a bomb; George uses that moment to snatch the Chronosteen hammer. The pair repeatedly chime the bell to alert the townsfolk and Home Guard of the emergency.

Sarah Jane arrives in a haunted house in 1889. She meets a girl, Emily Morris, who is looking for the ghosts having recently lost her mother. At eight o'clock the "haunting" begins. They hear a woman talking and the children she is babysitting playing with fire. Sarah Jane soon determines that the "ghosts" are not from the past, however, but the future – where a fire will start and kill the children, and the Chronosteen is the key that locks the children inside in the future. Sarah Jane resets the clock to eight o'clock and they see the children in the locked room playing with a candle. Emily calls out to the children and they hear her; it is her fear from losing her mother that connects her with them. Emily uses this ability to turn the key in the lock and the children escape. Sarah Jane returns to the present, but Emily holds onto the key. She passes the key to her granddaughter, Angela Price, to help close the unstable time windows back in the shop on the day of the newspaper article about the alien sighting more than 100 years later.

Filming location
When Clyde is sent back into World War II, he ends up hiding with a boy on a beach behind some sand dunes. The filming location here was in Freshwater West, near Tenby, Wales.

References

External links

2010 British television episodes
The Sarah Jane Adventures episodes
Television episodes about time travel
Cultural depictions of Lady Jane Grey
Fiction set in the 1550s
Fiction set in 1889
Fiction set in 1941
Norfolk in fiction
Television episodes set in the 16th century
Television episodes set in the 19th century
Television episodes set in the 1940s
Television episodes about Nazis
Television episodes about World War II